Ely Henry (born October 18, 1991) is a Canadian-American actor and comedian. He is best known for his roles in Smallfoot, Some Freaks and Mean Girls.

Career
Henry's first role was in the critical and box-office success Mean Girls, written by Tina Fey. He shifted to filmmaking briefly, attending Sheridan College in Oakville, Ontario, until moving to Los Angeles to focus on his acting career. He later landed a role, 10 years later, in a pilot created by Fey once again. However, the pilot was not picked up. He worked on the television series Roadies, created by Cameron Crowe.

After working as a temporary voice (also known as a scratch vocal) for the animated film Smallfoot, he was invited to join the main cast.

Henry co-starred in the short-lived NBC comedy titled Connecting created by Martin Gero and Brendan Gall. The series is set during the ongoing COVID-19 pandemic in the United States.

Filmography

References

External links
 

1991 births
Living people
21st-century Canadian male actors
Canadian expatriate male actors in the United States
Canadian male film actors
Canadian male television actors
Canadian male voice actors
Male actors from Toronto